Ivan Ivanovich Lazhechnikov (September 25, 1792 – July 8, 1869) was a Russian writer.

Biography
Lazhechnikov was born into the family of a rich merchant in Kolomna in 1792. He received a well-rounded education from private tutors at home. He served in the active army in 1813–15, which inspired his Campaign Notes of a Russian Officer.

Lazhechnikov was one of the originators of the Russian historical novel, along with Faddey Bulgarin, Mikhail Zagoskin and others. His first novel, The Last Novik (1831–33), set in the early 18th century, was very successful. His novel The House of Ice (1835) dealt with the intrigues and horrors of the court of Empress Anna. The novel was praised by the influential critic Vissarion Belinsky for its authentic portrayal of the details of the period’s social climate. The Infidel, a novel set in the time of Ivan III, was translated into English as The Heretic. He also published several historical dramas including Oprichnik (1843, published in 1859), on which the libretto of Tchaikovsky’s opera is based.

Lazhechnikov died in Moscow in 1869.

English translations
The Heretic, (3 vols), William Blackwood and Sons, 1845. from Archive.org

References

See also
List of Russian-language writers
Russian literature

1792 births
1869 deaths
People from Kolomna
People from Kolomensky Uyezd
Russian dramatists and playwrights
Russian male dramatists and playwrights
Russian historical novelists
Russian male novelists
19th-century novelists from the Russian Empire
19th-century dramatists and playwrights from the Russian Empire
19th-century male writers from the Russian Empire